Early Royall Bailey (September 23, 1929 – June 12, 2006) was a Canadian football player who played for the Hamilton Tiger Cats. He won the Grey Cup with them in 1953. He previously played football at Tulane University from 1951 to 1952, earning a letter in the sport. He signed with the Kitchener-Waterloo Dutchmen rugby team in 1957 after serving in the United States Air Force for 2 years.

References

1929 births
2006 deaths
Hamilton Tiger-Cats players
Players of American football from Arkansas
Sportspeople from Little Rock, Arkansas
Tulane Green Wave football players